Joe Alt (born February 28, 2003) is an American football offensive tackle for the Notre Dame Fighting Irish.

Career
Alt attended the Totino-Grace High School in Fridley, Minnesota. He played offensive tackle and tight end in high school. He committed to the University of Notre Dame to play college football.

As a true freshman at Notre Dame in 2021, Alt played offensive tackle and tight end. He played in all 13 games and started the final 13 games at left tackle. He returned to Notre Dame as the starting in left tackle in 2022.

Personal life
His father, John Alt, played in the NFL for the Kansas City Chiefs. His older brother, Mark, is a NHL defenseman.

References

External links
Notre Dame Fighting Irish bio

Living people
Players of American football from Minnesota
American football offensive tackles
Notre Dame Fighting Irish football players
2003 births